Central Station (with venues in Moscow and Saint-Petersburg) and Three Monkeys (Moscow) are a set of gay clubs managed by the same team.

Moscow

Central Station is the largest gay bar and night club in Moscow, Russia. Before 2014 the club was located in the several places in the center of Moscow, but closed in March 2014 in part due to a series violent attacks, which included a shooting, gas and water attacks. It was later re-opened at the present location that is to the south of the center.

Central station is open daily from 10pm until the morning, the entrance is free for both men and women on most days but a cover charge may exist at weekends and some other days. It has two halls with a scene, dance floors and three bars; the larger hall has a gallery and a lounge area with a dark labyrinth. The club also has a fenced summer terrace outside with a separate bar. Central station is known for its colorful drag shows and the after-party, which is held on Saturdays and Sundays starting from 5 am. There is a face control.

Saint-Petersburg

Central Station is the biggest and most European style gay bar and night club in Saint-Petersburg, Russia. It is a Saint-Petersburg's branch of the Moscow bar with the same name. The bar is open daily from 10pm until the morning, the entrance is free for men on most days but a cover charge may exist on some days. The entrance is restricted for women on most days and there is a tight face control. Central station has several bars situated on three floors, a restaurant with karaoke, dance floor, a lounge area and a dark labyrinth. There is an after-party starting at 5 am on Saturdays and Sundays.
There is also companion sauna Voda located in the same building.  Central station holds regular cruising party called Hunters Party.

References

LGBT culture in Russia
LGBT nightclubs
Nightclubs in Russia